Blue Bash! is an album by the guitarist Kenny Burrell with organist Jimmy Smith, recorded in 1963 and released on the Verve label.

Track listing
 "Blue Bash" (Jimmy Smith) – 5:05   
 "Travelin'" (Traditional) – 5:28   
 "Fever" (Eddie Cooley, John Davenport) –  5:35   
 "Blues For Del" (Kenny Burrell) – 6:15   
 "Easy Living" (Leo Robin, Ralph Rainger) – 2:52   
 "Soft Winds" (Benny Goodman) – 5:44   
 "Kenny's Sound" (Burrell)– 3:50

Personnel

Musicians
 Kenny Burrell – guitar
 Jimmy Smith – organ
 Milt Hinton – bass, (tracks 3 & 4)
 George Duvivier – double bass, (tracks 5-7)
 Bill English – drums, (tracks 3 & 4)
 Mel Lewis – drums, (tracks 1, 2 & 5-7)

Technical
 Creed Taylor – producer 
 Val Valentin – engineer
 Phil Macy, Phil Ramone, Rudy Van Gelder – assistant engineers
 Lee Friedlander – photography
 Del Shields - liner notes

References

Kenny Burrell albums
Jimmy Smith (musician) albums
1963 albums
Verve Records albums
Albums produced by Creed Taylor